Explorer S-46 was a NASA satellite with a mass of . It was the last of the original series of Explorer satellites built, designed, and operated by the Jet Propulsion Laboratory and Army Ballistic Missile Agency (ABMA).

Mission 
Its mission was to analyze electron and proton radiation energies in a highly elliptical orbit.

Spacecraft 
Explorer S-46 was a joint ABMA / NASA-JPL mission. The payload detector experiments were developed by the State University of Iowa. The detector assembly comprised five instruments: a Cadmium sulfide (CdS) broom low-energy proton detector, a Cadmium sulfide (CdS) low-energy particle detector; an electron spectrometer; a Geiger-Müller high-energy particle counter; and a Geiger-Müller medium energy particle counter. These were housed in the front of the Sergeant rocket engine that comprised the fourth (upper-stage) of the Juno II launch vehicle.

Payload experiments 
 Cadmium sulfide (CdS) Proton Detector
 Cadmium sulfide (CdS) Particle Detector
 Electron Spectrometer
 High Energy Geiger–Müller Tube
 Medium Energy Geiger-Müller Tube

Juno II 
The four-stage Juno II launch vehicle used a Jupiter missile engine as the first stage. The second stage was assembled as a circumferential "tub" of 11 scaled-down Sergeant rocket engines (solid propellant), the third stage was assembled as three scaled-down Sergeant rocket engines nested in the center of the "tub", and a single modified Sergeant rocket engine and casing comprising the fourth stage was mounted on top of this.

Launch 
Explorer S-46 was launched using a Juno II launch vehicle on 23 March 1960, at 13:35:11 GMT, from LC-26B. Telemetry was lost shortly after the first stage burnout and one second stage motor failed to ignite, resulting in imbalanced thrust and inability to reach orbital velocity. The spacecraft did not achieve orbit.

See also 

 Explorer 8
 Explorer program

References 

Spacecraft launched in 1960
Explorers Program
Satellite launch failures